Prey On You is the second EP of the Illinois-based industrial band, I:Scintilla. The album contains three new songs and five remixes. Two of the new songs, Prey On You and Ammunition, are also featured on their next full-length album, Dying and Falling. In addition, Hollowed is on the bonus disc of the limited edition release of Dying and Falling.

Track listing 
 "Prey On You" - 06:30
 "Ammunition" - 04:50
 "Hollowed" - 03:31
 "Prey On You (Sebastian Komor Mix)" - 05:57
 "Prey On You (Hard Dance Mix by Studio-X)" - 05:37
 "Prey On You (Cylab Mix)" - 05:01
 "Ammunition (C/A/T Mix)" - 05:31
 "Hollowed (Indigent Mix by Die Warzau)" - 03:58

References 

I:Scintilla albums
2009 EPs